The Welsh Church Act 1914 is an Act of Parliament under which the Church of England was separated and disestablished in Wales and Monmouthshire, leading to the creation of the Church in Wales. The Act had long been demanded by the Nonconformist community in Wales, which composed the majority of the population and which resented paying taxes to the Church of England. It was sponsored by the Liberal Party (a stronghold of the Nonconformists) and opposed by the Conservative Party (a stronghold of the Anglicans).

Background 
The Act, which took effect in 1920, was a controversial measure and was passed by the House of Commons under the provisions of the Parliament Act 1911, which reduced the power of the House of Lords to block legislation. The main financial terms were that the Church no longer received tithe money (a land tax), but kept all its churches, properties and glebes. The Welsh Church Commissioners were set up by the Act to identify affected assets and oversee their transfer.

The Act was politically and historically significant as one of the first pieces of legislation to apply solely to Wales (and Monmouthshire) as opposed to the wider legal entity of England and Wales.

The passing of the Bill was the culmination of a long campaign in Wales which had begun in the mid-nineteenth century, led largely by Welsh Nonconformists such as Calvinistic Methodists, Baptists, Unitarians, and other Protestant groups which objected to paying tithes to the Church of England. The campaign was later strongly supported by the patriotic Cymru Fydd movement.

English author G. K. Chesterton, an Anglican who would be received in the Catholic Church in 1922, ridiculed the passion that was generated by the Bill in his 1915 poem Antichrist, or the Reunion of Christendom: An Ode, repeatedly addressing F. E. Smith, one of the chief opponents of the Act.

Owing to the outbreak of the First World War in August 1914, the Act was given royal assent on 18 September simultaneously with another controversial bill, the Government of Ireland Act 1914. In addition, royal assent was also given to the Suspensory Act 1914 which stated that the two other Acts would not come into force for the remainder of the war. On 31 March 1920 most of the Welsh part of the Church of England became the Church in Wales, an independent province of the Anglican Communion, with (originally) four dioceses led by the Archbishop of Wales. However, 18 out of 19 church parishes which spanned the Welsh/English border overwhelmingly voted in individual referendums to remain within the Church of England. For example, St Stephen's Church, Old Radnor (Powys, Wales) is part of the diocese of Hereford, England.

The Welsh Church Act and the Government of Ireland Act were (together with the Parliament Act 1949) the only Acts enacted by invoking the Parliament Act 1911 until the War Crimes Act in 1991.

An analysis published by Wales Humanists at an event in the Senedd in 2020, reflecting on 100 years of disestablishment in Wales, credited the Welsh Church Act 1914 as a critical component in the development of Wales' distinctively pluralistic and secular approaches to governance in the era of devolution.

Disendowment
Some details of the disendowment process are to be found under Welsh Church Commissioners.

See also
 Religion in Wales
 Irish Church Act 1869
 List of Acts of the Parliament of the United Kingdom enacted without the House of Lords' consent

References

Further reading
 O’Leary, Paul. "Religion, Nationality and Politics: Disestablishment in Ireland and Wales 1868–1914." in Contrasts and Comparisons: Studies in Irish and Welsh Church History, edited by J.R. Guy and W.G. Neely (1999): 89–113.
 Taylor, Simon J. "Disestablished Establishment: High and Earthed Establishment in the Church in Wales." Journal of Contemporary Religion 18.2 (2003): 227–240.
 Watkin, T. G. "Disestablishment, Self-determination and the Constitutional Development of the Church in Wales." in Essays in Canon Law–A Study of the Church in Wales (U of Wales Press, 1992).
 Williams, Glanmor. The Welsh Church from Reformation to Disestablishment, 1603-1920 (U of Wales Press, 2007).

1914 in Wales
United Kingdom Acts of Parliament 1914
Anglicanism
History of Christianity in Wales
Church in Wales
Church of England disestablishment
Constitutional laws of Wales
Politics of Wales
Acts of the Parliament of the United Kingdom concerning Wales
Christianity and law in the 20th century
History of Monmouthshire
1914 in international relations
Acts of the Parliament of the United Kingdom passed under the Parliament Act
Law about religion in the United Kingdom
1914 in Christianity
September 1914 events